Promethean World Ltd is a global education technologies company that develops, integrates and implements learning environments. Promethean is held by NetDragon Websoft, a Chinese video game company, who acquired Promethean in 2015. The company's global headquarters are located in Seattle, in addition to regional offices in Atlanta and Blackburn.

History
Tony Cann founded Promethean in Blackburn, Lancashire in 1996. 1997 saw the launch of PandA software, the forerunner to Activstudio and Activprimary, a range of software for use in company presentations and meetings. Promethean initially used interactive whiteboards (branded as Quora) from the USA, before designing and building their own from the Blackburn facility. Tony Cann was replaced by Graham Howe as chairman in July 2005. James Marshall became CEO in September 2012, replacing Jean-Yves Charlier. In May 2014, Graham Howe stood down as chairman, and was replaced by Philip Rowley. In July 2015, NetDragon announced that it had agreed to buy the company. In September 2015, Promethean acquired touch and gesture technology from Light Blue Optics for an undisclosed sum.

References

External links
Promethean World

Education companies established in 1997
Companies based in Blackburn
Educational technology companies
Display technology companies
2015 mergers and acquisitions

it:Lavagna Interattiva Multimediale
nl:Elektronisch schoolbord
pt:Quadro Interactivo